Leys may refer to:

People
 Colin Leys, Oxford academic
 Jan August Hendrik Leys (1815–1869), Belgian painter
 Lenaert Leys, better known as Leonardus Lessius (1554–1623), Belgian Jesuit and moral theologian
 Simon Leys, pen name of Pierre Ryckmans
 Sally Leys, Canadian spongiologist

Other uses
 Blackbird Leys, civil parish in Oxford, England
 Beaumont Leys, electoral ward in England
 Ley line, places of geographical and historic interest
 The Leys School, school in Cambridge
 Loch of Leys, ancestral home of Burnett of Leys, a Lowland Scottish clan

See also

 
 Ley (disambiguation)